Österreichisch-Weiß (literally, Austrian white) is a grape variety for white wine. It is now very rarely cultivated, but is noted for being one of the parents of Silvaner, the other parent being Traminer. Österreichisch-Weiß itself is the offspring of Weißer Heunisch (Gouais blanc) as father with an unknown mother variety.

In older times, Österreichisch-Weiß (up to 90%) blended with Traminer contributed to giving "Grinzinger" (wine from Grinzing in Vienna) a good reputation.

It is often confused with Brauner Veltliner. The name Österreicher has previously also been used as a synonym for Brauner Veltliner and Silvaner.

References

White wine grape varieties